Federico Consoli (Brescia, 31 October 1998) is an Italian rugby union player.
His usual position is as a Scrum half and he currently plays for Calvisano in Top12.

References 

It's Rugby France Profile
All Rugby Profile
ESPN Profile

1998 births
Living people
Italian rugby union players
Rugby union scrum-halves
Sportspeople from Brescia